Bandini may refer to:

Surname
Angelo Maria Bandini (1726–1803), Italian author and librarian
Arcadia Bandini de Stearns Baker (1825–1912), heiress and daughter of early Californian Juan Bandini
 Domenico Bandini of Arezzo (c. 1335 – 1418), author of Fons memorabilium universi
Helen Elliott Bandini, American (California) writer, primarily of history
Ilario Bandini (1911-1992), Italian businessman, racing driver, and founder of Bandini Automobili (see below)
Juan Bandini (1800–1859), politician and early settler of San Diego, California
Lorenzo Bandini (1935-1967), Italian motorcar racing driver
Monica Bandini (1964–2021), Italian road racing cyclist

Other uses
Arturo Gabriel Bandini, the best known main character and alter ego of John Fante
Arturo Bandini, a studio album recorded by Züri West in 1991
Bandini Automobili, an Italian automobile manufacturer from 1946 to 1992, named for its founder, Ilario Bandini
Bandini (film), a 1963 Indian film directed and produced by Bimal Roy, starring Nutan and Ashok Kumar
Bandini (TV series), an Indian television soap by Ekta Kapoor
A type of tankini
Bandini, Iran, a village in Sistan and Baluchestan Province, Iran

See also
Bandhini